This is a list of events from British radio in 1951.

Events
1 January – The Archers production series debuts on the BBC Light Programme; it will still be broadcast 70 years later as the world's longest-running radio "soap".
2 July – The English language programmes of Radio Luxembourg move from long wave to the medium wave frequency of 208 metres (1439 kHz).
August – Tony Hancock joins the cast of Educating Archie as Archie's tutor (until January 1952).

Debuts
28 May – The Goon Show (as Crazy People), on the BBC Home Service (1951–1960)
2 July – The New Adventures of Dan Dare, Pilot of the Future, on Radio Luxembourg (1951–1956)

Continuing radio programmes

1930s
 In Town Tonight (1933–1960)

1940s
 Music While You Work (1940–1967)
 Sunday Half Hour (1940–2018)
 Desert Island Discs (1942–Present)
 Family Favourites (1945–1980)
 Down Your Way (1946–1992)
 Have A Go (1946–1967)
 Housewives' Choice (1946–1967)
 Letter from America (1946–2004)
 Woman's Hour (1946–Present)
 Twenty Questions (1947–1976)
 Any Questions? (1948–Present)
 Mrs Dale's Diary (1948–1969)
 Take It from Here (1948–1960)
 Billy Cotton Band Show (1949–1968)
 A Book at Bedtime (1949–Present)
 Ray's a Laugh (1949–1961)

1950s
 Educating Archie (1950–1960)
 Listen with Mother (1950–1982)

Births
2 February – Ken Bruce, Scottish radio presenter
1 March – Mike Read, DJ
13 May – James Whale, radio presenter
14 May – Max Reinhardt, music presenter
24 June – David Rodigan, DJ
9 August – James Naughtie, Scottish journalist and radio presenter
10 September – Sally Grace, actress
20 September – John Lloyd, comedy producer

See also 
 1951 in British music
 1951 in British television
 1951 in the United Kingdom
 List of British films of 1951

References 

 
Years in British radio
Radio